George Willoughby Hemans (27 August 1814 – 29 December 1885) was an Irish architect and engineer who designed several major railway schemes in Ireland and the UK during the mid 19th century.

He was born in St Asaph, North Wales, on 27 August 1814.

Hemans studied for three years at a French military college (the ) in Sorèze, showing academic abilities in languages, science and drawing. He spent his early career with the Ordnance Survey as a pupil of London-based engineer Sir John Macneill, who later appointed him as resident engineer for the Dublin end of the railway to Drogheda, where he supervised the first iron lattice bridges in Ireland. In 1845, after his next commission, to take charge of a railway line between Dublin and Cork, he was appointed chief engineer by the directors of the Midland Great Western Railway of Ireland to prepare plans for a line to Mullingar and Longford.

In 1854, Hemans moved to London, where his railway engineering works included the Vale of Clwyd, the East Grinstead and Groombridge and Tunbridge Wells, and the Tewkesbury and Malvern lines.

He became a member of the Institution of Civil Engineers in 1837 becoming a member of its council in 1856, and later vice-president. He was also a member of the Institution of Civil Engineers of Ireland from 1845, serving as council member 1846–1849, 1860–61, 1885; vice-president 1850–1856; president 1857–1859; and honorary member from 1 December 1881. He was a member of the Royal Institute of Architects 1840–1852 and the Royal Zoological Society, acting as council member 1850–1853.

Hemans moved to New Zealand in 1870, where he was appointed engineer-in-chief for Canterbury Province, and later for all New Zealand.

Family
Hemans was the eldest son of Irish army officer Captain Alfred Hemans and poet Felicia Hemans (née Browne), who married in 1812.

References

1814 births
1885 deaths
People from St Asaph
Irish engineers
New Zealand engineers